Dunăreni may refer to several places in Romania:

 Dunăreni, a village in Aliman Commune, Constanța County
 Dunăreni, a village in Goicea Commune, Dolj County